Averill Ann Curdy is an American poet and academic.

Life
She received her MFA from the University of Houston and her PhD from the University of Missouri.

Curdy worked as an arts administrator and as a marketing manager and technical editor.

Her work has appeared in Poetry, The Paris Review, Raritan and the Kenyon Review.

She lives in Chicago and is a professor at Northwestern University.

Awards
 2007 Literature Fellowship from the National Endowment for the Arts.
 2005 Rona Jaffe Foundation Writers' Award 
 2007 Lannan Writing Marfa Residency Fellowship

Works
"Anatomical Angel", Poetry, (June 2006)
"To the voice of the retired warden of Huntsville Prison (Texas death chamber)", Poetry, (June 2009)
"Hardware", Poetry, (June 2009)
"Probation", Poetry, (April 2005)
"Femme Fatale", Slate, June 1, 2004

Editor

References

External links
"Averill Curdy, Poet", Gapers Block, John Hospodka, Dec 14 2006

Year of birth missing (living people)
Living people
University of Houston alumni
University of Missouri alumni
Northwestern University faculty
American women poets
Rona Jaffe Foundation Writers' Award winners
American women academics
21st-century American women